The 1896 Southwestern Presbyterian football team represented Southwestern Presbyterian in the 1896 college football season. It was the school's first team, and played its first game against Vanderbilt.

Schedule

References

Southwestern Presbyterian
Rhodes Lynx football seasons
College football winless seasons
Southwestern Presbyterian football